Olaf Anders Tveitmoe (December 7, 1865 - March 19, 1923) was a Norwegian-born American teacher, newspaper editor, and labor leader. Tveitmoe was a leading trade union functionary for the construction industry in the state of California for the first two decades of the 20th century. He was the founding editor of the weekly newspaper Organized Labor, which he edited for 20 years. He is best remembered for tangential trade union activity as the founder and president from 1904 to 1912 of the Asiatic Exclusion League, a political organization which sought to bolster American domestic wage levels by restricting immigration from Japan, China, and Korea.

Biography

Early years
Olaf Anders Tveitmoe was born  at  Valdres in Oppland, Norway. He emigrated to the United States in 1882, settling in Holden Township, Goodhue County, Minnesota, where he worked variously as a farmhand. He entered a college preparatory program at St. Olaf's School (today's St. Olaf College) in the fall of 1886, gaining admission to the college program at St. Olaf's. Tveitmoe's college career proved to be short-lived, however, as he dropped out of the program in the 30th week of a 36-week program during his Freshman year.

Later, Tveitmoe moved to the Pacific Coast, settling first in the state of Oregon, where he was instrumental in organizing a utopian socialist communal colony. Located near the town of Toledo in Lincoln County, Oregon and named after popular socialist novelist Edward Bellamy, Bellamy Colony briefly engaged in agricultural activity and petty manufacturing before failing to gain economic critical mass and failing.

Trade union career
In 1897 Tveitmoe moved from Oregon to San Francisco, California. There he began work in the building industry, gaining election as president of the local Cement Workers' Union in 1898.  He remained in that position until 1900, when he was elected recording and corresponding secretary of the San Francisco Building Trades Council. Tveitmoe added the position of secretary of the California Building Trades Council to his resume in 1901 and he would retain both of these positions until 1922, the year before his death.

In 1903 Tveitmoe helped to organize a new national union of cement workers, the American Brotherhood of Cement Workers, of which he served as the first secretary-treasurer from 1903 to 1904. Despite his new role as a trade union functionary, Tveitmoe remained involved in journalism as editor of the weekly newspaper Organized Labor from 1900 until 1920. In this role he became the right-hand man of P. H. McCarthy, chief of the San Francisco Building Trades Council and the controversial mayor of San Francisco from 1910 to 1912.
Tveitmoe briefly served as a national trade union official, being chosen in 1911 as the vice president of the Building Trades Department of the American Federation of Labor. He was tried for involvement in a five-year nationwide campaign of dynamite bombing and found guilty in 1912, but ultimately acquitted upon appeal in 1914.

Anti-Asian Exclusion League
In March 1905, concerned by the prospect of unrestricted immigration from the populous low wage countries of Asia into the United States and its potential impact upon wage rates, the Labor Council of San Francisco launched a campaign against further Japanese immigration into the country, with Tveitmoe placed in the leading role. This was followed on May 7, 1905 with a mass meeting at Metropolitan Hall in San Francisco chaired by Tveitmoe, at which was established the Japanese and Korean Exclusion League.
In 1907 this organization changed its name to the Asian Exclusion League, with Tveitmoe remaining head of this organization until 1912.

Death and legacy
Tveitmoe died in Santa Cruz, California. He was 57 years old at the time of his death. Tveitmoe was buried at Cypress Lawn Memorial Park cemetery in Colma, California.

Personal life
In the spring of 1889, Tveitmoe was married to a fellow émigré from Valdres, Ingeborg Ødegaard (1859-1935). The first of the couple's six children would be born in May 1891.

Footnotes

Works
 Olaf Tveitmoe, "Bellamy Beamings" Industrial Freedom [Edison, WA], whole no. 40 (Feb. 4, 1899), pg. 2.

Further reading

 Raymond Leslie Buell, "The Development of the Anti-Japanese Agitation in the United States," Political Science Quarterly, vol. 37, no. 4 (Dec. 1922), pp. 605–638.
 Michael Kazin, "The Great Exception Revisited: Organized Labor and Politics in San Francisco and Los Angeles, 1870-1940," Pacific Historical Review, vol. 55, no. 3 (Aug. 1986), pp. 371–402. In JSTOR.
 James J. Kopp and J.A. Dean, "Looking Backward at Edward Bellamy's Influence in Oregon, 1888-1936," Oregon Historical Quarterly, vol. 104, no. 1 (Spring 2003), pp. 62–95. In JSTOR
 Robert E. Wynne, "American Labor Leaders and the Vancouver Anti-Oriental Riot," Pacific Northwest Quarterly, vol. 57, no. 4 (Oct. 1966), pp. 172–179. In JSTOR.

1863 births
1923 deaths
Norwegian emigrants to the United States
American socialists
People from San Francisco
American trade union leaders
Activists from California
People from Lincoln County, Oregon